Irvinebank Dam (also known as Loudoun Weir) is a heritage-listed timber and concrete weir initially constructed around 1885 when a tin battery was built. The two creeks which form the basis of the dam at Irvinebank were known as Gibbs Creek and McDonald Creek, after the earliest prospectors. The battery was erected on the Gibbs Creek frontage, and the dam was constructed just below the junction of these two creeks and embraced an area, when full, of about 12 -  of water, with depths varying from about  down to about two or three feet.

The dam was upgraded with concrete in 2006, retaining the original timbers in the facade. Following the discovery of a leak in 2017, work was carried out between December 2020 and August 2021 to repair the leak and replace six original logs in the facade with "like-for-like" new timber.

See also

List of dams and reservoirs in Australia

References

Reservoirs in Queensland
Buildings and structures in Far North Queensland
Dams in Queensland
1885 establishments in Australia
Dams completed in 1885